Thomas D. Kinzie House is a historic home located at Troutville, Botetourt County, Virginia. It was built between 1909 and 1911, and is a -story, brick dwelling in the Queen Anne style. It features a complex slate-covered hipped roof with projecting, pedimented gables, and a one-story wraparound porch. Also on the property are a contributing raised-face concrete block and frame spring house, a raised-face concrete block garage, two sheds and a large frame bank barn.

It was listed on the National Register of Historic Places in 2002.

References

Houses on the National Register of Historic Places in Virginia
Queen Anne architecture in Virginia
Houses completed in 1911
Houses in Botetourt County, Virginia
National Register of Historic Places in Botetourt County, Virginia
1911 establishments in Virginia